Julio Alberto González Bascuñán (born 11 June 1978) is a Chilean football referee. He refereed matches in the 2015 and 2016 Copa América.

In 2018, he served as an arbitrator for the final stage of the 2018 FIFA World Cup.

References

1978 births
Living people
Chilean football referees
Copa América referees
People from Santiago
2018 FIFA World Cup referees